Glenariff Forest Park is an 1185 hectare (2928 acre) forest in County Antrim, Northern Ireland.  It is part of Glenariff glen itself. The forest is managed by the Northern Ireland Forest Service, the state body responsible for forestry in the province, which is part of the Department of Agriculture, Environment and Rural Affairs.

Features
The Waterfall Walkway, opened 80 years ago, has been significantly upgraded along its 3-mile length which passes through a National Nature Reserve. There are three waterfalls, forest trails and riverside walks, as well as a visitor centre, shop, and seasonal caravan/camping site and restaurant.

Timber production
As well as being a recreational resource, the forest is used for timber production centered on the clearfelling of coniferous plantation trees.

References

Forest Service information

Forests and woodlands of Northern Ireland
Parks in County Antrim